Mae Mercer (June 12, 1932 – October 29, 2008) was an American blues singer and actress. She was born in the Temperance Hall community of Edgecombe County. 

Mercer lived in North Carolina through age 15. She spent eight years in the 1960s singing in a blues bar in Paris, the Blues Club, owned by publisher Maurice Girodias and touring Europe. She eventually came to own and operate a blues club in the city. 

Mercer returned to the United States in the early 1970s to begin a career as an actress in films and television. Films in which she appeared included Dirty Harry (1971), The Beguiled (1971), Frogs (1972), Cindy (1978), and Pretty Baby (1978). She was co-producer of the documentary film Angela Davis: Portrait of a Revolutionary (1972).

In 1996, the Mayor of Rocky Mount, NC, Fred Turnage, declared June 12 Mae Mercer Day. During this time, Mercer sought to produce her own biographical picture through her production company Black Owl Productions and was backed by local pastor Reverend James Bullock. Filming was slated to take place in Edgecombe County and other parts of North Carolina, New York, Paris and Southern California.

Filmography

References

External links
 
 Los Angeles Times obituary

1932 births
2008 deaths
American blues singers
American film actresses
American television actresses
African-American actresses
20th-century African-American women singers
People from Rocky Mount, North Carolina
Actresses from North Carolina
20th-century American singers
20th-century American actresses
20th-century American women singers
21st-century American actresses
21st-century African-American women
21st-century African-American people